Arthrobacter halodurans is a Gram-positive, aerobic, halotolerant and non-motile bacterium species from the genus Arthrobacter which has been isolated from seawater from the South China Sea near Naozhou Island, China.

References

Further reading

External links
Type strain of Arthrobacter halodurans at BacDive -  the Bacterial Diversity Metadatabase

Bacteria described in 2012
Micrococcaceae